Verratti is an Italian surname. Notable people with the surname include:

Ciro Verratti (1907–1971), Italian fencer
Marco Verratti (born 1992), Italian footballer

Italian-language surnames